Kim Yong-jin (Korean: 김용진; born 23 February 1953 – died July 2016) was a senior North Korean official. Kim served as North Korea’s education minister, and in 2012 was made a vice-premier.

Execution
In August 2016, it was reported that he had been executed by firing squad for allegedly displaying a bad attitude at a national meeting and failing to stand upright. Kim was subsequently branded an "anti-party and a counter-revolutionary member" by North Korea’s State Security. The information was confirmed by South Korea's Unification Ministry spokesman, Jeong Joon Hee.

References

2016 deaths
Workers' Party of Korea politicians 
1953 births
Education ministers of North Korea